KIOM-LP (98.9 FM) is a low-power FM radio station licensed to Kaunakakai, Hawaii, United States. The station is currently owned by KROS Radio Association.

History
The Federal Communications Commission issued a construction permit for the station on December 17, 2001. The station was assigned the KIOM-LP call sign on December 27, 2001, and received its license to cover on September 11, 2003.

References

External links
 

IOM-LP
Radio stations established in 2003
IOM-LP